Patterson Brothers Shipping Company LTD is Fiji's longest running inter-island ferry operation bridging the gap between Viti Levu, Vanua Levu, and  Ovalau daily, They also provide trips to  Kadavu and Koro Island.

The company is a family run inter-island ferry operation with offices based in Suva,  Nakasi, Lautoka, Labasa, Savusavu,  Nabouwalu and Levuka And Agents Located at  Ba,  Tavua,  Rakiraki, Dreketi, Lekutu and Seaqaqa, The company operates roll-on/roll-off freight and passenger shipping across Fiji and trucking and logistics and freight services across the Pacific Ocean. 

The integrated land and sea transportation service jointly provided by Patterson Brothers Shipping Company Ltd and Fiji Searoad Service connecting the main islands of Fiji via multi-modal transport system with Roro ferries and coach transfers.

History 
The company has its origins in Levuka, founded by George Patterson and Henry Patterson in 1924, Inter-island ferry operations began in 1924. By 2020, the company had more than 200 staff across Fiji.

Area served 
 Lautoka - Natovi - Nabouwalu - Labasa/Savusavu 
 Suva - Natovi - Nabouwalu - Labasa/savusavu 
 Suva - Natovi - Buresala - Levuka
 Suva - Natovi - Koro
 Suva - Vunisea - Kavala (Kadavu Island)
 Suva - Kavala - Vunisea (Kadavu Island)
 Suva - Rotuma (Franchise) 
 Suva - Lau Islands (Franchise)

Fleet

Current

Former ships

References

External links
Facebook
Instagram

Transport organisations based in Fiji
Suva
Transport companies of Fiji
Transport companies established in 1924
Fijian companies established in 1924